West End Elementary School can refer to:

 West End Elementary School (Carey, Ohio), on the National Register of Historic Places
West End Elementary School (Gaffney, South Carolina), a former NRHP
West End Elementary School (Easley, South Carolina)
West End Elementary School (Meadville, Pennsylvania)